"All This Time" is a song by New Zealand band Drax Project. A song that had been a part of the band's live performance set for years, it was released as a single from their debut album Drax Project in June 2019.

Background and composition

"All This Time" was inspired by songs the band had covered in their early days as a band which had large drops. The song was one of the earliest the band had written, and became a staple of the band's live set since 2017. The band had difficulty recording the song, as the energy from the band's live shows did not translate well to the song.

Release

The song was released on 12 June 2019. In August 2021, New Zealand musician Lee Mvtthews released a remix of the song.

Critical reception

The song was nominated for the Aotearoa Music Award for Single of the Year at the 2019 New Zealand Music Awards, losing to "Soaked" by Benee

Credits and personnel

Credits adapted from Tidal.

Matt Beachen – songwriting
Drax Project – performance
Rogét Chahayed – producer
Taylor Dextor – producer
Chris Gehringer – mastering engineer
Tony Maserati – mixing
Ben O'Leary – songwriting
Vasilys Papageorgiou – songwriting
Wes Singerman – producer
Shaan Singh – songwriting, vocals
Sam Thomson – songwriting

Charts

Weekly charts

Year-end charts

Certifications

References

2019 singles
2019 songs
Drax Project songs
New Zealand songs